The Hungarian Chemical Society was founded in 1907. It is a voluntary society of more than 2,000 members which aims to provide a forum for those interested in chemistry and promote chemistry in Hungary.

The Hungarian Chemical Journal is the official journal of the society and is released monthly.

References

External links 

 

1907 establishments in Hungary
Chemistry societies
Scientific organizations established in 1907
Learned societies of Hungary